The Football League play-offs for the 1990–91 season were held in May and June 1991, with the finals taking place at Wembley Stadium. The play-off semi-finals were also played over two legs and were contested by the teams who finished in 3rd, 4th, 5th and 6th  place in the Football League Second Division, the 4th, 5th, 6th and 7th placed teams in the Football League Third Division and the 3rd, 4th, 5th and 6th place teams in the Football League Fourth Division table. The winners of the semi-finals progressed through to the finals, with the winner of these matches gaining promotion for the following season.

Second Division

Semi-finals
First leg

Second leg

Brighton & Hove Albion won 6–2 on aggregate.

Notts County won 2–1 on aggregate.

Final

Third Division

Semi-finals
First leg

Second leg

Bolton Wanderers won 2–1 on aggregate.

Tranmere Rovers won 3–2 on aggregate.

Final

Fourth Division

Semi-finals
First leg

Second leg

Blackpool won 3–2 on aggregate.

Torquay United won 2–1 on aggregate.

Final

External links
Football League website

 
English Football League play-offs